Broomall is a census-designated place (CDP) in  Marple Township, Delaware County, Pennsylvania, United States. The population was 10,789 at the 2010 census.

History

This crossroads community was renamed for the post office established to honor John Martin Broomall, a 19th-century U.S. congressman, Electoral College member (at Ulysses S. Grant's 1872 presidential election), and Chester Gas Company president from Upper Chichester Township in Delaware County, Pennsylvania.

Broomall is home to the biotechnology company Drummond Scientific Company. Drummond's Pipet-Aid pipette controller, released in 1972, improved accuracy and pipetting capabilities in laboratories.

The Thomas Massey House is listed on the National Register of Historic Places.

Geography
Broomall is located in northeastern Delaware County at  (39.971561, −75.354674). It is in the eastern part of Marple Township and is bordered to the east by Darby Creek and to the north by Pennsylvania Route 3 (West Chester Pike). Pennsylvania Route 320 (Sproul Road) is the main north–south road in the community.

The climate is a hot-summer humid continental climate (Dfa) very closely bordering a humid subtropical climate (Cfa). PRISM Climate Group, Oregon State U Average monthly temperatures range from 31.9 °F in January to 77.1 °F in July. PRISM Climate Group, Oregon State U The local hardiness zone is 7a.

Education
Public schools located in Broomall that are part of the Marple Newtown School District are:
Loomis Elementary
Russell Elementary
Worrall Elementary
Paxon Hollow Middle School.
Marple Newtown Senior High School is the public school for Newtown Square, Newtown Township, and Broomall, Marple Township.  
Paxon Hollow Middle School Participates in an annual fundraiser for Alex's Lemonade Stand with Haverford Middle School.

Demographics
As of the census of 2000, there were 11,046 people, 4 households, and 3,148 families residing in the CDP. The racial makeup of the CDP was 91.41% White, 0.63% African American, 0.10% Native American, 7.17% Asian, 0.16% from other races and 0.53% from two or more races. Hispanic or Latino of any race were 0.62% of the population.

There were 4 households, out of which 28.4% had children under the age of 18 living with them, 62.2% were married couples living together, 8.6% had a female householder with no husband present, and 26.1% were non-families. 22.8% of all households were made up of individuals, and 12.8% had someone living alone who was 65 years of age or older. The average household size was 2.57 and the average family size was 3.06 people.

In the CDP the population was spread out, with 21.4% under the age of 18, 6.5% from 18 to 24, 26.2% from 25 to 44, 24.6% from 45 to 64, and 21.2% who were 65 years of age or older. The median age was 43 years. For every 100 females, there were 92.1 males. For every 100 females age 18 and over, there were 88.8 males.

The median income for a household in the CDP was $52,354, and the median income for a family was $63,902. Males had a median income of $45,181 versus $31,646 for females. The per capita income for the CDP was $24,940. About 2.4% of families and 4.4% of the population were below the poverty line, including 3.7% of those under the age of 18.

Notable people from Broomall
Mark Arnold, actor notable for his role as the second Joe Perkins on NBC's soap opera Santa Barbara
Danny Bonaduce, radio/television personality, comedian, and former child actor who as an adult became known for his tumultuous personal life
Len Cella, comedy film actor and director; his short films Moron Movies appeared on The Tonight Show Starring Johnny Carson
Natasha Cloud, WNBA player for the Washington Mystics
Jim Fullington, professional wrestler
Joe Grady, radio personality
Carl Gugasian, criminal known as "The Friday Night Bank Robber". He robbed more than 50 banks over a 30-year period, for a total of more than $2 million.
John Kincade, sports talk show host based in Atlanta for WCNN 680 "The Fan"
Andrew L. Lewis Jr., United States Secretary of Transportation from 1981 to 1983
Vincas Krėvė-Mickevičius, Lithuanian writer, poet, novelist, playwright and philologist
Thomas Massey, English-American Quaker landowner who built the Thomas Massey House
David Miscavige, leader of the Church of Scientology
Marta Kauffman-known for co-creating the show Friends

References

 
Census-designated places in Delaware County, Pennsylvania